Temindung Airport  was the airport of Samarinda from 1974 until 2018. It was officially known as Samarinda Airport, it was closed and replaced by the new APT Pranoto International Airport at Sungai Siring,  to the north. It is often known as Samarinda Airport, Temindung Airport, or simply Temindung, to distinguish it from its successor which is often referred to as Sungai Siring Airport.

The airport was home to Samarinda's carrier Kaltim Airlines. Temindung is located on the north side of Karangmumus River in Sei Pinang, Samarinda. There is only one runway in use, numbered 04/22 and oriented northeast–southwest (34/214 degrees true, 32/212 degrees magnetic). Near the southern end of the runway, a building rose up to nine stories.

History

1980s to 1990s
Clearance requirements for aircraft takeoffs and landings made it necessary to limit the height of buildings that could be built in Samarinda. While Temindung was initially located far away from residential areas, the expansion of residential areas resulted in Temindung being close to residential areas. This caused serious noise pollution for nearby residents. A night curfew from night to about 7:00 in the early morning also hindered operations.

As a result, in the early 1990s, the Samarinda Government began searching for alternative locations for a new airport in Samarinda to replace the aging airport. After deliberating on a number of locations, including the south side of Samarinda, the government decided to build the airport on the district of Sungai Siring.

Former airlines and destinations

Passenger

Operations

Terminals and facilities

The Temindung airport consisted of a linear passenger terminal building with a car park at the front. There is one boarding gate at the terminal building.

Due to the limited space, the fuel tank farm is located between airport authority building and maintenance facilities (hangar).

Airlines based at Temindung

Several airlines were based at Temindung:

 Kaltim Airlines
 DAS
 Kurakura Aviation
 Kalstar Aviation

Future plans for the site
The Government drafted a plan for Temindung Airport site to be used for commercial area, housing estate, hotels and green space.

References

External links

 Pictures from Temindung: Airliners.net – Jetphotos.net/Jetphotos.net

Defunct airports in Indonesia
1973 establishments in Indonesia
2018 disestablishments in Indonesia
Airports established in 1973
Airports disestablished in 2018
Airports in East Kalimantan
Samarinda